William Henry Hanzlik (born December 6, 1957) is an American former professional basketball player and coach.

College career
A 6'7" guard, Hanzlik played college basketball at the University of Notre Dame. He was selected for the 1980 US Men's Olympic Team, which did not compete due to the US's boycott of the Moscow Games. However, in 2007 he did receive one of 461 Congressional Gold Medals created especially for the spurned athletes.

Professional career
He was selected with the 20th pick of the 1980 NBA draft by the Seattle SuperSonics.  A defensive specialist, at the time of his selection Hanzlik had the lowest college scoring average (7.2 ppg) for any player selected in the first round of the draft.  Hanzlik played in the NBA for ten years – two with the Sonics and eight with the Denver Nuggets. He was a 1986 All-Defense second team selection.  He worked as an assistant with the Charlotte Hornets and Atlanta Hawks in the 1990s.

He remains a positive and contributing person in the Denver community.

Coaching career
In 1997, Hanzlik (then an assistant with Atlanta) was tabbed to replace Dick Motta as head coach of the Denver Nuggets. He coached the Nuggets for one year, posting an 11–71 record (only two games better than the all-time worst team, the 1972–73 Philadelphia 76ers). He was fired at the end of the season and replaced with Mike D'Antoni.  To date, Hanzlik owns the worst full-season record for a rookie coach in NBA history.

Head coaching record

|-
| style="text-align:left;"|Denver
| style="text-align:left;"|
|82||11||71|||| align="center"|7th in Midwest|||—||—||—||—
| style="text-align:center;"|—
|- class="sortbottom"
| style="text-align:left;"|Career
| ||82||11||71|||| ||—||—||—||—||

References

External links
 Player stats at Basketball-Reference
 Coach stats at Basketball-Reference

1957 births
Living people
American men's basketball coaches
American men's basketball players
Atlanta Hawks assistant coaches
Basketball coaches from Ohio
Basketball coaches from Wisconsin
Basketball players from Ohio
Basketball players from Wisconsin
Charlotte Hornets assistant coaches
Congressional Gold Medal recipients
Denver Nuggets assistant coaches
Denver Nuggets head coaches
Denver Nuggets players
Notre Dame Fighting Irish men's basketball players
Parade High School All-Americans (boys' basketball)
Sportspeople from Beloit, Wisconsin
Sportspeople from Middletown, Ohio
Seattle SuperSonics draft picks
Seattle SuperSonics players
Shooting guards
Sportspeople from the Cincinnati metropolitan area